The first season of the Greek version of the Nomads aired from October 2, 2017 until December 22, 2017 on ANT1.
It took place in Palawan, Philippines, for 12 weeks. The winner received €150,000.
It featured 21 players divided into three nomad tribes: Fire, Oceans, Jungle. Apostolia Zoi was the winner of this season.

Teams 
1) Nomads of Fire, Symbol: Kunalada, Color: Red. Showbusiness people.
2) Nomads of Oceans, Symbol: Bakunawa, Color: Blue. Athletes.
3) Nomads of Jungle, Symbol: Tamaraw, Color: Green. Everyday people.

Rules 
The rules of the game for every week:
 Week starts with the Territory game. The winning tribe will live in a villa for this week, the runner-up tribe will live in a local village and the last one will live on a beach.

Every week tribes have a captain who changes at the start of the next one. The player who is eliminated chooses next week's captains.
Second Day: First Immunity Game. Loser tribe nominates two players for elimination. One by captain and one by the rest of the tribe.
Third Day: Second Immunity Game. Loser tribe from the first Immunity Game doesn't play here. Loser tribe of this game nominates one player for elimination.
Fourth Day: Captains' Game. Winner takes reward for the tribe.
Fifth and Final Day: Duel. At first, one player is saved from public vote. Then, the two remaining players duel in a series of matches with the loser being eliminated from Nomads.

From week 4 (instead of week 6 as it was planned), with only two tribes existing (Fire and Oceans in this season) the rules changed a bit:
Second Day: First Immunity Game. Loser tribe nominates one player for Duel.
Third Day: Second Immunity Game. This immunity is individual. The rest of the players go to public vote. The player with the fewest votes goes to Duel.

From week 9, tribes no longer exist and players merge.
First Day: Territory Game. Winner takes one person with him in villa. The rest of the players stay on the beach.
Second Day: First Immunity Game. Individual Immunity. Loser player is nominated. One extra player is nominated by vote.
Third Day: Second Immunity Game. Same as the first Immunity Game.
For Duel, from the four nominated players, by public vote, two players are nominated to Duel.

For the last weeks, the following rules take place.
No Territory Games. All players live at the beach.
After all players agreeing, 50,000 € from the final prize can be won by players at different games.
Immunity Game: Two losers are nominated. One extra player is nominated by vote.
Duel: From the three nominated players, by public vote, two players are nominated to Duel.

Contestants

Season summary

The 21 players were initially divided into three nomad tribes: Fire, Oceans and Jungle.

Games
Note: In Score, first number is for Fire, second is for Oceans and the third is for Jungle. In Duel, the score is between two individual players.
From Episode 16, Fire and Oceans only exist.
Merge happened in Episode 41.
Episode 46, it was the last Territory Game.

Votes

Voting history 

 From week 4, one player is nominated by tribe, one players wins immunity and the rest are being voted by public with the least favorite being the second nominated player for Duel.

 Manos was eliminated. But Olga decided to leave. So Manos returned.

 Mike was eliminated. But Manto decided to leave because of an injury. So Mike returned.

 From week 9, final nominated players, who go to Duel, are chosen by public vote.

Tribe captains 

 First week, every tribe chose their captain. For the following weeks, each tribe's captain was chosen by the eliminated player.

 Nicolas Papadopoulos was chosen captain for this week but because of an injury, George Katsinopoulos took this place. At the end of the week, he returned as captain. Evaggelia Platanioti played the Captains Game.

 Panagiotis Vasilakos walked. So, he had no right to choose next week's captains. With vote 6-1, Dimitra is Oceans' captain and with vote 5-2, Apostolia is Fire's captain. Furthermore, Jungle Tribe no longer exists and the nomads of this tribe will go to the other tribes.

 Last tribe captains.

References 

2017 Greek television seasons